Tujhyat Jeev Rangala is an Indian romantic television series aired on Zee Marathi which is produced by Sobo Films. It is one of the longest-running television series in Marathi.

Plot

Cast

Main 
 Hardeek Joshi as Ranvijay Prataprao Gaikwad (Ranada / Raja Rajgonda); Anjali's husband, Suraj's brother, Nandita's brother-in-law, Aaba's son, Godakka's foster son, Barkat's friend (2016-2020)
 Rudra Revankar as young Ranvijay (2017)
 Akshaya Deodhar as Anjali Ranvijay Gaikwad or Anjali Dinkar Pathak (Pathak Bai / Jija); Rana's wife, Suraj's sister-in-law, Aaba's daughter-in-law (2016-2020)

Recurring 
Rana's family
 Dhanashri Kadgaonkar as Nandita Suraj Gaikwad or Nandita Uttamrao Jadhav (Taisaheb); Rana's sister-in-law, Suraj's wife, Aaba's daughter-in-law (October 2016-October 2019)
 Madhuri Pawar replacing Dhanashri as Nandita Suraj Gaikwad (October–December 2020)
 Raj Hanchanale as Suraj Prataprao Gaikwad (Sunnyda); Rana's younger brother, Nandita's husband, Aaba's younger son (2016-2020)
 Siddhesh Khuperkar as young Suraj (2017)
 Chhaya Sangaokar as Godavari (Godakka); Rana & Suraj's foster mother (2016-2020)
 Milind Dastane as Minister Prataprao Gaikwad (Aaba); Rana & Suraj's father, Anjali & Nandita's father-in-law (2016-2019)
 Dipti Sonawane-Kshirsagar as Chanda (2016-2020)
 Vagmee Shevade as Rajalaxmi Ranvijay Gaikwad (Lakshmi) (2019-2020)
 Shreyas Mohite as Yuvaraj Suraj Gaikwad (2019-2020)
 Sandhya Manik as Madhuri Suraj Gaikwad or Madhuri Jawale (2019-2020)

Villagers
 Amol Naik as Barkat (2016-2020)
 Kalyani Jadhav as Radha (2016-2019)
 Rajveersingh Raje as Rajveer (Ladu) (2018-2019)
 Umesh Bolake as Renuka's father (Bapu) (2016-2020)
 Shruti Kulkarni as Renuka (2016-2019)
 Prafulla (Pappu) Gawas as Mahajan Head Sir (2016-2020)
 Avadhut Joshi as Avadhya (2016-2020)
 Abhishek Kulkarni as Paresh Patil (2018-2020)
 Yogesh Kumar Powar as Bandya (2018-2020)
 Sanjeevkumar Patil as Nivrutti Naik (2019-2020)
 Neha Bam as Nandita's mother (2016-2020)
 Atul Sanas as Jayant (2017-2018)
 Prachi Godbole as Anjali's mother (2016-2019)
 Shivraj Walvekar as Inspector Sangram Mohite (January–March 2020)
 Balkrishna Shinde replacing Shivraj as Inspector Sangram Mohite (July–August 2020)

Guest Appearances 
 Chala Hawa Yeu Dya celebs (2019)
 Vikas Patil as Aditya Gore (2019)
 Rucha Apte as Manager Sakhi (2018)
 Shriram Kolhatkar as Balsara Sir (2018)
 Akshay Kumar as Jolly (2017)

Production

Seasons 
 22 June 2019 (2 Years Later)
 27 October 2019 (6 Years Later)
 17 August 2020 (6 Months Later)

Special episode

1 hour 
 25 December 2016
 26 November 2017
 22 July 2018
 6 January 2019
 27 October 2019
 15 December 2019
 1 November 2020

2 hours 
 5 March 2017 (Rana-Anjali's Marriage)
 19 August 2018 (Rana lost in Mumbai)
 25 November 2018 (International Wrestling Competition)

Airing history

Awards

Adaptations

Reception 
The series premiered on 3 October 2016 from Monday to Saturday at 7.30 pm by replacing Nanda Saukhya Bhare.

Ratings

References

External links 
 
 Tujhyat Jeev Rangala at ZEE5

Marathi-language television shows
Zee Marathi original programming
2016 Indian television series debuts
2021 Indian television series endings